South Kintyre is one of the eleven wards used to elect members of the Argyll and Bute Council. It elects three Councillors.

Councillors

Election Results

2022 Election
2022 Argyll and Bute Council election

2017 Election
2017 Argyll and Bute Council election

2012 Election
2012 Argyll and Bute Council election

2007 Election
2007 Argyll and Bute Council election

References

Wards of Argyll and Bute
Campbeltown
Kintyre